Final results for the Tennis competition at the 1920 Summer Olympics in Antwerp, Belgium. The competition was held from Monday, 16 August 1920 to Tuesday, 24 August 1920.

Medal summary

Events

Medal table

Participating nations
A total of 75 tennis players (52 men and 23 women) from 14 nations (men from 14 nations - women from 8 nations) competed at the Antwerp Games:

  (men:1 women:0)
  (men:8 women:8)
  (men:6 women:1)
  (men:1 women:2)
  (men:7 women:3)
  (men:4 women:4)
  (men:1 women:0)
  (men:3 women:1)
  (men:2 women:0)
  (men:2 women:1)
  (men:5 women:0)
  (men:4 women:0)
  (men:5 women:3)
  (men:3 women:0)

References

External links
 International Olympic Committee medal database
  ITF, 2008 Olympic Tennis Event Media Guide

 
1920
1920 Summer Olympics events
Olympics
1920 Olympics